This is a list of compositions by Swiss-German Romantic composer Joachim Raff. Raff was a prolific composer and composed numerous works in a wide variety of genres. His works include eleven symphonies, five concertos, six operas, eight string quartets, numerous other chamber works, over 100 works for solo piano and many songs and song cycles.

Orchestral

Symphonies 

 WoO. 18: Grand Symphony in E minor in five movements (lost; movements 4 and 5 re-used in Orchestral Suite No. 1 in C major, Op. 101)
 Op. 96: Symphony No. 1 in D major An das Vaterland ("To the Fatherland") (1859-1861)
 Op. 140: Symphony No. 2 in C major (1866)
 Op. 153: Symphony No. 3 in F major Im Walde ("In the Forest") (1869)
 Op. 167: Symphony No. 4 in G minor (1871)
 Op. 177: Symphony No. 5 in E major Lenore (1870-1872)
 Op. 189: Symphony No. 6 in D minor Gelebt: Gestrebt, Gelitten, Gestritten - Gestorben - Umworben ("Lived: Struggled, Suffered, Fought - Died - Glorified") (1874)
 Op. 201: Symphony No. 7 in B-flat major In den Alpen ("In the Alps") (1875)
 Op. 205: Symphony No. 8 in A major Frühlingsklänge ("Sounds of Spring") (1876)
 Op. 208: Symphony No. 9 in E minor Im Sommer ("In Summer") (1878)
 Op. 213: Symphony No. 10 in F minor Zur Herbstzeit ("To Autumn Time") (1879)
 Op. 214: Symphony No. 11 in A minor Der Winter ("The Winter") (1876, unfinished; completed by Max Erdmannsdörfer)

Soloist and orchestra 

 Op. 67: The Love Fairy: Characteristic Concert Piece in A minor for violin and orchestra (1854)
 Op. 76: Ode to Spring: Concert Piece in G major for piano and orchestra (1857)
 Op. 161: Violin Concerto No. 1 in B minor (1870-1871)
 Op. 180: Suite for Violin and Orchestra in G minor (1873)
 Op. 185: Piano Concerto in C minor (1873)
 Op. 193: Cello Concerto No. 1 in D minor (1874)
 Op. 200: Suite for Piano and Orchestra in E-flat major (1875)
 WoO 45: Cello Concerto No. 2 in G major (1876)
 Op. 206: Violin Concerto No. 2 in A minor (1877)

Orchestral suites 

 Op. 101: Orchestral Suite No. 1 in C major (1863)
 WoO. 35: Italian Suite in E minor (1871)
 Op. 194: Orchestral Suite No. 2 in F major In the Hungarian Style (1874)
 WoO. 45: Orchestral Suite No. 3 in B-flat major Thüringian (1877)

Other orchestral works 

 WoO. 15: Festival Overture (1851-1852; lost)
 WoO. 16a: Fantasy in the form of a grand freely developed Overture (1853; destroyed by the composer)
 WoO. 17: Music to the tragedy Bernhard von Weimar (1854)
 Op. 103: Celebration Overture (1864)
 Op. 117: Festival Overture in A major (1864)
 Op. 123: Concert Overture in F major (1862)
 Op. 124: Festival Overture in B-flat major (1865)
 Eine feste Burg ist unser Gott, Ouvertüre zu einem Drama aus dem Dreißigjährigen Krieg (A mighty fortress is our God", Overture to a drama about the Thirty Years' War), Op. 127
 Op. 139: Festival March (1867)
 WoO. 48: Elegy for Orchestra (1879)
 WoO. 49: Orchestral Prelude to Shakespeare's The Tempest (1879)
 WoO. 50: Orchestral Prelude to Shakespeare's Macbeth (1879)
 WoO. 51: Orchestral Prelude to Shakespeare's Romeo and Juliet (1879)
 WoO. 52: Orchestral Prelude to Shakespeare's Othello (1879)
 WoO. 56: Grand Fugue for Orchestra (1882; fragment)

Operas and choral works

Operas 

 WoO. 14: King Alfred, opera in four acts (1848-1849)
 WoO. 20: Samson, opera in five acts (1853-1854)
 WoO. 29: The Password, opera in three acts (1868)
 Op. 154: Lady Phantom, comic opera in three acts (1870)
 WoO. 46: Benedetto Marcello, opera in three acts (1877-1878)
 WoO. 54: The Jealous Ones, comic opera in three acts (1881-1882)

Works for chorus and orchestra 

 WoO. 8: Der 121. Psalm (Psalm 121, 1848)
 WoO. 16: Te Deum (1853)
 WoO. 19: Dornröschen (Sleeping Beauty or Briar Rose), fairy-tale epic in four parts (1855)
 Op. 80: Wachet auf! (Awake!), cantata after Emanuel Geibel (1858)
 Op. 100: Deutschlands Auferstehung (Germany's Resurrection), Festival Cantata for the fiftieth anniversary of the Battle of
 Op. 141: De Profundis, Psalm 130 for soprano, eight-part choir, and orchestra, dedicated to Franz Liszt (1867)
 WoO. 30a: Accompaniment of six wind instruments for the Laudi Sion & Stabat mater of the church in Lachen (1868; lost)
 Op. 171: Zwei Lieder (Two songs) for mixed choir and orchestra(1871)
 Op. 186: Morgenlied (Morning song)' and One Who Has Passed Away (1873)
 Op. 209: Die Tageszeiten (The times of day), text by Helge Heldt (pseudonym of Helene Raff), four movements for piano, choir and orchestra (1877-1878)
 WoO. 53: Die Sterne (The stars), text by Helge Heldt, cantata for choir and orchestra (1880)
 Op. 212:  (World's End - Judgement - New World), oratorio (1879-1881)

Works for choir a capella 

 Op. 97: Ten Songs for Men's Choir (1853-1863)
 Op. 122: Ten Songs for Men's Choir (1853-1863)
 WoO. 27: Four Marian Antiphones after the Cantus Firmus of the Roman church (1868)
 WoO. 31: Kyrie and Gloria (1869)
 WoO. 32: Pater Noster (1869)
 WoO. 33: Ave Maria (1869)
 Op. 195: Ten Songs for Men's Choir (1860-1870)
 Op. 198: Ten Songs for Mixed Choir (1860-1874)

Chamber music

Piano quintets 

 Op. 107: Piano Quintet in A minor (1862)
 Op. 207b: Fantasy for Piano Quintet in G minor (1877)

Piano quartets 

 Op. 202, No. 1: Piano Quartet No. 1 in G major (1876)
 Op. 202, No. 2: Piano Quartet No. 2 in C minor (1876)

Piano trios 

 WoO. 9: Piano Trio in C minor (1849-1850; destroyed by the composer)
 Op. 102: Piano Trio No. 1 in C minor (1861)
 Op. 112: Piano Trio No. 2 in G major (1863)
 Op. 155: Piano Trio No. 3 in A minor (1870)
 Op. 158: Piano Trio No. 4 in D major (1870)

String quartets 

 WoO. 13: String Quartet in C major (1849-1850; destroyed by the composer)
 Op. 77: String Quartet No. 1 in D minor (1855)
 Op. 90: String Quartet No. 2 in A major (1857)
 Op. 136: String Quartet No. 3 in E minor (1866)
 Op. 137: String Quartet No. 4 in A minor (1867)
 Op. 138: String Quartet No. 5 in G major (1867)
 Op. 192: Three String Quartets (1874)
 No. 6 in C minor, Suite in Ancient Style
 No. 7 in D major, The Maid of the Mill
 No. 8 in C major, Suite in Canon Form

Violin sonatas 

 Op. 73: Violin Sonata No. 1 in E minor (1853-1854)
 Op. 78: Violin Sonata No. 2 in A major (1858-1859)
 Op. 128: Violin Sonata No. 3 in D major (1865)
 Op. 129: Violin Sonata No. 4 in G minor (1866)
 Op. 145: Violin Sonata No. 5 in C minor (1868)

Other works for violin and piano 

 Op. 57: From Switzerland: Fantastic Eclogue (1848)
 Op. 58: Two fantasy pieces for violin and piano (1850-1852)
 Op. 59: Duo for piano and cello or violin in A major (1855)
 Op. 85: Six pieces for violin and piano (1859)
 Op. 203: Volker, cyclic tone poem (1876)
 Op. 210: Suite for violin and piano in A major (1879)
 WoO. 55: Duo for violin and piano in G minor (1882)

Works for cello and piano 

 Op. 59: Duo for piano and cello or violin in A major (1855)
 Op. 86: Three fantasy pieces for cello and piano (1854)
 Op. 182: Two Romances for cello and piano (1873)
 Op. 183: Cello Sonata in D major (1873)

Other chamber works 

 Op. 124: Festival Overture for wind instruments on four beloved student songs (1865)
 WoO. 25: Introduction and Fugue for organ in E minor
 Op. 176: String Octet in C major (1872)
 Op. 178: String Sextet in G minor (1872)
 Op. 188: Sinfonietta in F major for 2 flutes, 2 oboes, 2 clarinets, 2 bassoons and 2 horns (1873)

Piano music 
 Op. 3: Scherzo in C minor (1842; revised 1881)
 Op. 7: Rondo brillante in B-flat major (1843)
 Op. 11: Air suisse in A-flat major (1844)
 Op. 14: Grand Sonata in E-flat minor (1844; revised 1881)
 Op. 38: Grand Mazurka in A-flat major (1847)
 Op. 41: Romance in A-flat major (1847; revised 1850)
 Op. 64: Caprice in F-sharp minor (1855)
 Op. 69: Piano Suite No. 1 in A minor (1857)
 Op. 71: Piano Suite No. 2 in C major (1857)
 Op. 72: Piano Suite No. 3 in E minor (1857)
 Op. 82: 12 Pieces for Piano Four Hands (1858-1859)
 Op. 91: Piano Suite No. 4 in D minor (1859)
 Op. 92: Caprice in D minor (1860)
 Op. 99: 3 sonatinas (1861)
 Op. 119: Fantasy in G minor (1864)
 Op. 142: Fantasy in D-flat major (1867)
 Op. 162: Piano Suite No. 5 in G minor (1870)
 Op. 163: Piano Suite No. 6 in G major (1871)
 Op. 168: Fantasy-Sonata in D minor (1871)
 Op. 197: Caprice in D-flat major (1875)
 Op. 204: Piano Suite No. 7 in B-flat major (1876)

Songs

Orchestral songs 

 Op. 66: Dream-King and his Love (1854)
 Op. 199: Two Scenes (1875)

Songs for multiple voices 

 Op. 114: Twelve Songs for Two Voices (1860-1864)
 Op. 184: Six Songs from Emanuel Geibel for Three Female Voices (1870-1873)

Lieder 

 Op. 16: Three Lieder from Lord Byron (1844; destroyed by the composer)
 Op. 18: Three Lieder from Julius Scheffel (1844; destroyed by the composer)
 Op. 47: Three Lieder from J.G. Fischer (1848)
 Op. 48: Two Lieder from Gotthold Logau (1848)
 Op. 49: Three Lieder from J.G. Fischer (1848)
 Op. 50: Two Italian Lieder from C.O. Sternau (1849)
 Op. 51: Five Lieder from Emanual Geibel (1849-1850)
 Op. 52: Three Lieder from C.O. Sternau (1850)
 Op. 53: Two Lieder from the Rhine from C.O. Sternau (1849)
 WoO. 20a: Fatal Love, cycle of lieder and songs (1855)
 Op. 98: Spring Songs, 30 compositions for one voice (Romances, Ballads, Lieder and Songs) with piano accompaniment (1855-1863)
 WoO. 21: Serenade from C.O. Sternau (1859)
 Op. 172: Maria Stuart, cycle of songs (1872)
 Op. 173: Eight Songs (1868-1870)
 Op. 191: The Language of Flowers, six songs from Gustav Kastropp (1874)
 WoO. 47: Spring Song (before 1879)
 WoO. 52a: Two Settings of Tennyson's Tears, Idle Tears (1878 or 1879)
 Op. 211: Blondel de Nesle, cycle of songs (1880)

Arrangements

Arrangements of works by others

Orchestral arrangements 

 WoO. 14a: Orchestration and arrangement of Liszt's original sketches for the overture Der entfesselte Prometheus (1850)
 WoO. 34a: Orchestration of Huldigungsmarsch ("Homage March") by Richard Wagner (1871)
 WoO. 39: J.S. Bach's Chaconne for solo violin, arranged for large orchestra (1874)
 WoO. 41: J.S. Bach's English Suite arranged for orchestra (1874)

Choral arrangements 

 WoO. 15b: Orchestral arrangement of Liszt's Psalm XX Domine salvum fac regum (1853)

Arrangements for piano four hands 

 Op. 13: Waltz-Rondino on some motifs from the opera Les Huguenots by Giacomo Meyerbeer (1844)
 Op. 42: Der Prätendent, music by Franz Kücken (1847)
 WoO. 39: J.S. Bach's Chaconne for solo violin, arranged for piano four hands (1874)

Arrangements for violin and piano 

 WoO. 10a: Arrangement of 3 Etudes and an Elegy for piano four hands by Karl Vollweiler (1849; unknown fate)
 WoO. 10b: Arrangement of 2 Romances for piano by Adolf von Henselt (1849; unknown fate)
 WoO. 10c: Arrangement of a song by Louis Spohr (1849; unknown fate)
 WoO. 10d: Arrangement of a song by Carl Reissiger (1849; unknown fate)
 WoO. 42: 3 Sonatas by Benedetto Marcello for Cello with added piano accompaniment employing free use of the numbered bass (1875)

Arrangements for solo piano 

 Op. 4: Brilliant Fantasy on some motifs from the opera Maria Rudenz by Gaetano Donizetti (1842)
 Op. 7: Brilliant Rondo on the air Io son ricco e tu sei bella from the opera L'Elisire d'amore by Gaetano Donizetti (1843)
 Op. 18: Two Paraphrases on Lieder by Franz Liszt (1845)
 Op. 19: Eight Lieder by Mendelssohn (1845; lost)
 Op. 19: Dramatic Fantasy on motifs from the opera Die Beiden Prinzen by Heinrich Esser (1845)
 Op. 20: Jaléo and Xeres: two Spanish Dances after Spanish national melodies (1844; lost)
 Op. 28: Two famous airs from the opera Robert le Diable by Giacomo Meyerbeer (1846; lost)
 WoO. 4a: Paraphrase on Les Huguenots (1846; abandoned)
 Op. 34: Six Lieder by Franz Abt, Luise Barthelemy, Franz Kücken, Bernhard Molique and Franz Schmidt (1847)
 Op. 35: Fantasy on motifs from the opera Freischütz by Carl Maria von Weber (1847)
 Op. 36: Military Fantasy on some motifs from the opera Les Huguenot by Giacomo Meyerbeer (1847)
 Op. 37: Fantasy on motifs from the opera La sonnambula by Vincenzo Bellini (1847)
 Op. 39: Nocturne after a Romance by Franz Liszt (1847)
 WoO. 7: Fantasy on themes from Kücken's Prätendent (1847; lost)
 Op. 42: Piano transcriptions from Der Prätendent by Franz Kücken (1847)
 Op. 43: Divertimento on motifs from Fromental Halévy's opera La Juive (1848)
 Op. 44: Fantasy on motifs from the opera The Barber of Seville by Gioachino Rossini (1848)
 Op. 45: Reminiscences from Mozart's Don Giovanni (1848)
 Op. 46: Impromptu on "The Last Rose of Summer" (1849)
 WoO. 10: Grand Fantasy on motifs from the opera Das Diamantkreuz by Siegried Salomon (1849; lost)
 WoO. 11: Arrangement of two violin romances by Ludwig van Beethoven (1849)
 WoO. 12: Valse-Rondino on motifs from the opera Das Diamantkreuz by Siegried Salomon (1849)
 WoO. 12a: Concert Etude on a motif from the opera Puritani by Vincenzo Bellini (1849?)
 Op. 61: Four arrangements for piano (1853-1855)
 No. 1: Caprice on Wagner's Lohengrin
 No. 2: Reminiscences on Wagner's The Flying Dutchman
 No. 3: Fantasy on motif's from Wagner's Tannhäuser
 No. 4: Capriccio and rondo on motifs from the opera Genoveva by Robert Schumann
 Op. 62: Three Salon-Etudes on Richard Wagner's Operas (1853)
 Op. 65: Two arrangements for piano (1855)
 No. 1: Fantasy on motifs from Benvenuto Cellini by Hector Berlioz
 No. 2: Caprice on motifs from the opera King Alfred
 Op. 68: Five Transcriptions after Beethoven, Gluck, Mozart, Schumann and Spohr (1857)
 Op. 70: Trovatore and Traviata, 2 Salon paraphrases after Verdi (1857)
 Op. 81: Two arrangements for piano (1858)
 No. 1: Sicilienne, Favourite air from the opera Les Vêpres Siciliennes by Verdi
 No. 2: Tarantella after the tarantella from the opera Les Vêpres Siciliennes by Verdi
 WoO. 22: Two Marches from Handel's oratorios: Saul and Jephta (1859)
 Op. 121: Illustrations of the opera L'Africaine by Giacomo Meyerbeer (1864)
 WoO. 23: Selected pieces from the Violin Sonatas by J.S. Bach (1865)
 WoO. 24: Concert paraphrase on "Evening Song" by Robert Schumann (1865)
 WoO. 26: Reminiscences on the opera Die Meistersinger von Nürnberg by Richard Wagner (1867)
 WoO. 30: Six Cello Sonatas by J.S. Bach arranged for piano (1868)
 WoO. 34: Improvisation on the lied "Der Lindenzweig" by Leopold Damrosch (1870)
 WoO. 37: Berceuse after an idea by Charles Gounod (1872)
 WoO. 38: Juliet's Waltz by Charles Gounod (1872)
 WoO. 40: Three orchestral suites by J.S. Bach arranged for piano (1874)

Arrangements of own works

Orchestral arrangements 

 Op. 163b: Evening Rhapsody, arrangement of Abends from the Piano Suite No. 5, Op. 163
 Op. 174: Mazurka, Polonaise, Russian dance, orchestral arrangement of three pieces from Aus dem Tanzsalon
 Op. 203: Hungarian Dance, arrangement for violin and orchestra

Arrangements for piano four hands 

Most of the arrangements for piano four hands are made after Raff's orchestral works.

 Op. 73b: First Grand Sonata, arrangement of the Violin Sonata No. 1 in E minor, Op. 73
 Op. 77b: String Quartet, arrangement of the String Quartet No. 1 in D minor, Op. 77
 Op. 78b: Second Grand Sonata, arrangement of the Violin Sonata No. 2 in A major, Op. 78
 Op. 96b: Symphony No. 1 in D major An Das Vaterland
 Op. 99b: Three Sonatilles
 Op. 101b: Orchestral Suite No. 1 in C major
 Op. 103b: Celebration Overture
 Op. 117b: Festival Overture
 Op. 123b: Concert Overture
 Op. 124b: Festival Overture for wind instruments on four beloved student songs
 Op. 127b: A mighty fortress is our God: Overture to a drama about the 30 Years War
 Op. 132b: Brilliant March
 Op. 135b: Leaves and Blossoms, 12 Piano Pieces
 Op. 136b: String Quartet No. 3, arrangement of the String Quartet No. 3 in E minor, Op. 136
 Op. 137b: String Quartet No. 4, arrangement of the String Quartet No. 4 in A minor, Op. 137
 Op. 138b: String Quartet No. 5, arrangement of the String Quartet No. 5 in G major, Op. 138
 Op. 139b: Festival March
 Op. 140b: Symphony No. 2 in C major
 Op. 150: Chaconne for Two Pianos
 Op. 153b: Symphony No. 3 in F major Im Valde
 Op. 167b: Symphony No. 4 in G minor
 WoO. 35b: Italian Suite in E minor
 Op. 177b: Symphony No. 5 in E major Leonore
 WoO. 28b: Waltz-Impromptu after The Tyrolienne
 Op. 181b: Dance of Death, second humoresque in waltz form
 Op. 188b: Sinfonietta in F major
 Op. 189b: Symphony No. 6 in D minor Gelebt, Gestrebt, Gelitten, Gestritten, Gestorben, Umworbe
 Op. 192b: Arrangement of the String Quartets Nos. 6, 7 & 8
 Op. 194b: Orchestral Suite No. 2 in F major In the Hungarian Style
 Op. 201b: Symphony No. 7 in B-flat major In den Alpen
 Op. 205b: Symphony No. 8 in A major Frühlingsklänge
 Op. 208b: Symphony No. 9 in E minor Im Sommer
 Op. 213b: Symphony No. 10 in F minor Zur Herbstzeit
 WoO. 49b: Orchestral Prelude to Shakespeare's The Tempest
 WoO. 50b: Orchestral Prelude to Shakespeare's Macbeth
 WoO. 51b: Orchestral Prelude to Shakespeare's Romeo and Juliet
 WoO. 52b: Orchestral Prelude to Shakespeare's Othello

Arrangements for voice and piano 

 WoO 14b: King Alfred
 WoO 20b: Samson
 Op. 66b: Dream-King and his Love
 Op. 80b: Awake!
 Op. 100b: Germany's Resurrection, Festival Cantata for the fifty year's jubilee of the German people's Battle at Leipzig
 Op. 141b: De profundis (Psalm 130)
 WoO. 29b: The Password
 Op. 154b: Lady Phantom
 Op. 171b: Two Songs for Mixed Choir
 Op. 186b: Morning Song and One Who Has Passed Away
 Op. 199b: Two Scenes
 Op. 209b: The Times of Day
 WoO. 46b: Benedetto Marcello
 Op. 212b: World's End - Judgement - New World

Arrangements for alternative piano accompaniment 

 Op. 67b: The Love Fairy
 Op. 76b: Ode to Spring
 Op. 161b: Violin Concerto No. 1 in B minor
 Op. 180b: Suite for Violin and Orchestra G minor
 Op. 193b: Cello Concerto No. 1 in D minor
 WoO. 44b: Cello Concerto No. 2 in G major
 Op. 206b: Violin Concerto No. 2 in A minor

Arrangements for solo piano 

 Op. 82b: 12 Pieces for Piano Four Hands
 Op. 139c: Festival March
 Op. 101c: Orchestral Suite No. 1 in C major
 Op. 154c: Lady Phantom
 Op. 174: From the Dance Salon
 Op. 177c: Symphony No. 5 in E major Leonore
 Op. 200b: Suite for Piano and Orchestra in E-flat major

Compositions by Joachim Raff
R